Jeffrey Walker Martin is the chairman and chief executive officer of Sempra, an energy infrastructure company based in San Diego, California. Sempra develops and owns energy transmission and distribution infrastructure with a focus on leading markets in North America, including California, Texas, Mexico and the liquefied natural gas export market. The company has 20,000 employees and serves roughly 40 million consumers – serving more U.S. customers than any other U.S. utility holding company.  

Martin has served as Sempra’s chief executive officer since May 2018 and as chairman since December 2018. In this role, Martin is leading Sempra’s mission to be North America’s premier energy infrastructure company. His early leadership focus is "people, priorities and culture," with a goal of creating a high-performance culture that drives the company's success.

He previously held the role of executive vice president and chief financial officer for Sempra from 2017 to 2018 and he held leadership roles in Sempra subsidiary companies. This included serving as chairman and CEO of San Diego Gas & Electric from 2014 to 2016 and as CEO of Sempra U.S. Gas and Power from 2010 to 2013.

In 2020, S&P Global Platts named Martin Chief Executive of the Year. Martin represents Sempra at the World Economic Forum in the Oil and Gas governors community and International Business Council and as co-chair of the Electricity governors community.

Military service 

Martin was a commissioned officer in the U.S. Army where he was an air cavalry pilot in the 3rd Armored Cavalry Regiment. He is a graduate of the U.S. Army Infantry Officer Basic Course, Airborne School and Flight School. Afterwards Martin served in the Third Armored Cavalry Regiment as a helicopter pilot and flight platoon leader. Martin left the Army with the rank of Captain in December 1989.

Education 
Martin holds a bachelor's degree from the United States Military Academy at West Point in 1984 and a master's in public administration from the University of Texas, El Paso. In 1992, he graduated from the University of Miami with a Juris Doctor's degree, where he also served as managing editor of the University of Miami Law Review.

Community involvement 
Martin serves on the board of trustees for the University of San Diego and philanthropically contributes to the university and other charitable causes.

Martin supports the Monarch School (San Diego), a public K-12 school exclusively for students who are homeless, at risk of being homeless, or impacted by homelessness. He and his wife Lisa Martin, who serves on the school's board of directors, co-chaired the 2019 fundraising gala and presented a graduate school scholarship to a former Monarch student at the event.

References

Year of birth missing (living people)
Living people
United States Military Academy alumni
University of Texas at El Paso alumni
University of Miami School of Law alumni
American energy industry executives